A veranda or verandah is a roofed, open-air gallery or porch.

Veranda may also refer to:
Veranda (magazine), an American lifestyle magazine
Union Pacific's Second Generation GTEL locomotives, commonly called the "Verandas" due to their design.

Verandah may also refer to:
Verandah (vine system), a vine training system
Verandah, Florida, United States, a census-designated place
Verandah, Isle of Man, a series of road bends on the island
Off the verandah, a concept in anthropology